Verkhneye Avryuzovo (Ürge Äwrez) is a rural locality (a village) in Nizhneavryuzovsky Selsoviet, Alsheyevsky District, Bashkortostan, Russia. The population was 99 as of 2010. There are 3 streets.

Geography 
Verkhneye Avryuzovo is located 29 km southwest of Rayevsky (the district's administrative centre) by road. Nizhneye Avryuzovo is the nearest rural locality.

References 

Rural localities in Alsheyevsky District